Shaun Reynolds (born 15 June 1995) is a South African rugby union player for the  in Super Rugby, the  in the Currie Cup and the  in the Rugby Challenge. His regular position is fly-half.

Rugby career

Schoolboy rugby / Griffons

Reynolds was born in Bloemfontein, but grew up in Welkom, where he earned call-ups to represent the  provincial side at national competitions since primary school level. He represented them at the Under-13 Craven Week in 2008, the Under-16 Grant Khomo Week in 2011 and played twice at the premier high school rugby union tournament in South Africa, the Under-18 Craven Week, in 2012 and 2013. He was the main kicker for the team at the 2013 event held in Polokwane, kicking 47 points in addition to scoring two tries to finish the tournament as the overall top scorer. He also played at Under-19 level for the Griffons in their 2012 and 2013 campaigns.

Youth rugby / Golden Lions

After school, Reynolds moved to Johannesburg, where he joined the  Academy. He played for the  team in the 2014 Under-21 Provincial Championship, scoring 74 points in nine starts. His tally included four tries, with two of those coming in a 41–36 victory over the s.

He played for the  team in the 2015 Under-19 Provincial Championship, scoring 84 points in 12 appearances, top-scoring for his side and fourth overall in Group A of the competition.

Senior career

Reynolds was named in the  squad for the 2016 Currie Cup qualification series.

Notes

References

1995 births
Living people
Golden Lions players
Lions (United Rugby Championship) players
Rugby union centres
Rugby union fly-halves
Rugby union players from Bloemfontein
South African people of British descent
South African rugby union players
USON Nevers players
White South African people